The following is a list of the most notable political families of the Philippines, each with the areas in which their influence was/is strong. Names in bold indicate the individual was/is a president of the Philippines.

The Philippine political arena is mainly arranged and operated by families or alliances of families, rather than organized around the voting for political parties.

A

B

C

D

E

F

G

H

I

J

K

L

M

N

O

P

Q

R

S

T

U

V

Y

Z

See also
 Political dynasties in the Philippines
 List of political families
 Politics of the Philippines
 Corruption in the Philippines

References

Further reading
 
 
 
 

 
Families
Philippines